The Roman Catholic Diocese of Thiès is a diocese located in the city of Thiès in the Ecclesiastical province of Dakar in Senegal.

On Friday, January 18, 2013, Pope Benedict XVI named the Rev. André Gueye as Bishop-designate of the Roman Catholic Diocese of Thiès, to be ordained and installed at a date in the near future (which would be May 25). Up until then, he had been serving as a member of the Thiès diocesan clergy, and as a professor of philosophy at the Major Seminary of Saint Jean Marie Vianney in Bris, Senegal (in the Roman Catholic Diocese of Ziguinchor in Ziguinchor, Senegal).

History
 February 6, 1969: Established as Diocese of Thiès from the Metropolitan Archdiocese of Dakar

Special churches
 The cathedral is Cathédrale Sainte Anne in Thiès.

Leadership
 Bishops of Thiès (Roman rite)
 Bishop François-Xavier Dione (1969.02.06 – 1985.02.04)
 Bishop Jacques Sarr (1986.10.17 - 2011.01.18)
 Bishop André Gueye (2014.01.18 -)

See also
Roman Catholicism in Senegal

References

 GCatholic.org
 Catholic Hierarchy

Roman Catholic dioceses in Senegal
Christian organizations established in 1969
Roman Catholic dioceses and prelatures established in the 20th century
Roman Catholic Ecclesiastical Province of Dakar